Bactrotheca is an extinct genus of orthothecid hyolith with a bulbous "protoconch".

References

Orthothecidae